Los Gatos Creek may refer to:

 Los Gatos Creek (Fresno County, California)
 Los Gatos Creek (Santa Clara County, California)
 Los Gatos Creek Park
 Los Gatos Creek Trail